"Rocky Mountain Music" is a song written and recorded by American country music artist Eddie Rabbitt.  It was released in June 1976 as the second single and title track from the album Rocky Mountain Music.  The song reached number 5 on the Billboard Hot Country Singles & Tracks chart.

German singer Jürgen Drews released a German version titled "Barfuß durch den Sommer" (Barefoot through the summer) which reached number 6 on the German charts and number 22 on the Austrian charts.

Charts

Weekly charts

Year-end charts

References

1976 singles
1976 songs
Eddie Rabbitt songs
Songs written by Eddie Rabbitt
Song recordings produced by David Malloy
Elektra Records singles